Peacock Cross railway station served the town of Hamilton, South Lanarkshire, Scotland, from 1878 to 1917 on the Glasgow, Bothwell, Hamilton and Coatbridge Railway.

History 
The station opened as Hamilton Peacock Cross on 1 November 1878 by the North British Railway. Nearby were various collieries nearby: Allanshaw, Fairhill, Cadzow and Bent collieries. However, the station only served Allanshaw colliery. To the east was Allanshaw signal box. The station's name changed to Peacock Cross in 1882. It closed on 1 January 1917.

References

External links 

Disused railway stations in South Lanarkshire
Former North British Railway stations
Railway stations in Great Britain opened in 1878
Railway stations in Great Britain closed in 1917
1878 establishments in Scotland
1917 disestablishments in Scotland
Buildings and structures in Hamilton, South Lanarkshire